Oman participated at the 2018 Summer Youth Olympics in Buenos Aires, Argentina from 6 October to 18 October 2018.

Athletics

Sailing

Oman was given one boat to compete by the tripartite committee.

 Boys' Techno 293+ - 1 boat

Swimming

References

2018 in Omani sport
Nations at the 2018 Summer Youth Olympics
Oman at the Youth Olympics